Ionuț Atodiresei (born September 25, 1981) is a Romanian Middleweight kickboxer. As kickboxer, he fights in the Local Kombat and SUPERKOMBAT Fighting Championships.

Career
Atodiresei was born in Fălticeni, Suceava County. He entered for the first time in a fight hall when he was 13 years old, and made his debut in 1999.

On 25 February 2012, he fought Saša Jovanović for WAKO-Pro K-1 rules super lightweight intercontinental title and lost the fight by decision unanimous. He had revenge on June 9, and Atodiresei won the WAKO-Pro -67 kg intercontinental title defeating Jovanović by decision.

On 7 December 2012, he vacated WAKO-Pro K-1 rules super lightweight intercontinental title and fought Spain's Aitor Eguzkiza for WAKO-Pro K-1 rules light welterweight world title. He won the title after five rounds by split decision.

He was TKO'd by Stauros Exacoustidis for the SuperKombat -65 kg title at SuperKombat World Grand Prix 10 in Craiova, Romania on May 18, 2013.

He defeated Kostas Papedelis at SuperKombat: New Heroes 5 in Târgoviște, Romania on August 30, 2013.

Atodiresei won against Calogero Palmieri by unanimous decision at SuperKombat World Grand Prix 11 in Botoșani, Romania on September 28, 2013.

Titles

Professional
2012 WAKO-Pro -64,5 kg World Title (K-1 Rules)
2012 WAKO-Pro -62,2 kg Intercontinental Title (K-1 Rules)
2005 Fight.ro Fight of the Year (vs. Filippo Cinti)
2005 WKN -60 kg ThaiBoxing European Champion
2004 WKN -62 kg ThaiBoxing European Champion

Professional kickboxing record

Mixed martial arts record

 |-
| Win
| align=center|3-3
| Azamat Mustafaev
| Submission (Arm-Bar)
| Real Xtreme Fighting 22 - Romania vs. Poland
| 
| align=center|3
| align=center|4:59
| Bucharest, Romania
|
|-
| Win
| align=center|2-3
| Robert Micura
| Submission (Arm-Bar)
| Real Xtreme Fighting 21 - MMA All Stars 2
| 
| align=center|1 
| align=center|1:36
| Bucharest, Romania
|
|-
| Loss
| align=center| 1-3
| Zoltan Turai
| Decision (Unanimous)
| Real Xtreme Fighting 20
| 
| align=center| 3
| align=center| 5:00
| Sibiu, Romania
| 
|-
| Loss
| align=center|1-2
| Samir Aliev
| Submission (Leg Lock)
| Real Xtreme Fighting 17 - Fight Night
| 
| align=center|1 
| align=center|4:18
| Craiova, Romania
| 
|-
| Win
| align=center|1-1
| Hamod Omar
| KO (Punch)
| Real Xtreme Fighting 15 - MMA All Stars
| 
| align=center|1 
| align=center|0:03
| Bucharest, Romania
| 
|-
|Loss
|align=center| 0-1
|Zsolt Fenyes
| Submission (Guillotine Choke)
| Real Xtreme Fighting 13 - Fight Night Moldova
| 
|align=center|1
|align=center|3:07
|Botoșani, Romania
|MMA debut.

See also 
List of male kickboxers

References

External links
 Facebook page

1981 births
Living people
Romanian male kickboxers
People from Fălticeni
SUPERKOMBAT kickboxers